Empire Creek may refer to -
Rivers
Empire Creek (Downie River), a tributary of the Downie River, California, USA
Empire Creek (Murrieta Creek), a tributary of Murrieta Creek, California
Ships
, a British coaster in service 1941-46